Shao Kahn is a fictional character in the Mortal Kombat fighting game franchise by Midway Games and NetherRealm Studios. Depicted as emperor of the fictional realm Outworld, he is one of the franchise's primary villains. Feared for his immense strength, which he complements with a large hammer, and knowledge of black magic, Shao Kahn seeks conquest of all the realms, including Earth. He serves as the final boss of Mortal Kombat II (1993), Mortal Kombat 3 (1995) and its updates, and the 2011 reboot, as well as the action-adventure spin-off Mortal Kombat: Shaolin Monks (2005). An amalgam of Shao Kahn and DC Comics villain Darkseid also appears as the final boss of Mortal Kombat vs. DC Universe (2009) under the name Dark Kahn.

Shao Kahn is one of the most celebrated villains in video games. While noted as a difficult boss, he has received praise for his design, in-game abilities, and mannerisms, particularly his mocking and taunting of players. The character has appeared in various media outside of the games, including as the main villain of the film Mortal Kombat: Annihilation (1997).

Appearances

Mortal Kombat games
Prior to the events of the game series, Shao Kahn was a warlord protecting Outworld and an advisor to the realm's ruler, Onaga. Eventually, Shao Kahn poisoned Onaga, claiming his throne and his armies. Kahn continued to add lesser realms to Outworld, including Edenia; forcing Queen Sindel and Princess Kitana to become his wife and personal assassin respectively. Sindel killed herself to escape the emperor, but he kept her soul in Outworld. One of the backward dialogues in Deceptions Konquest Mode suggests that Shao Kahn is a god-like being like Lucifer and the thunder god Raiden.

Shao Kahn first appears in Mortal Kombat II as the game's final boss and main villain. After the crooked tournament Grandmaster Shang Tsung and his warriors lose to Earthrealm in Mortal Kombat, Kahn invokes a tournament rematch clause which will allow him to take Earthrealm immediately if he wins. Though he lures Earthrealm's warriors to Outworld to kill them, he is defeated by the Shaolin Monk Liu Kang, who halts his plans.

Mortal Kombat 3 features Shao Kahn as the final boss once more. The game's story sees Shang Tsung resurrect Queen Sindel in Earthrealm, allowing Kahn to reclaim her by invading Earth; ignoring the Mortal Kombat tournament's rules. The Emperor strips billions of people's souls to empower himself and merges Earthrealm with Outworld. He also sends extermination squads to kill Raiden's chosen few who were protected from this fate. Eventually, Liu Kang defeats the Kahn a second time, forcing him and his Outworld armies to retreat; restoring Earth and Edenia to normal.

After being absent from Mortal Kombat 4, Shao Kahn has a brief cameo in Mortal Kombat: Deadly Alliance. The Emperor, weakened from battle with Edenia and abandoned by many of his soldiers, is killed by the titular Alliance of Shang Tsung and the sorcerer Quan Chi. Shao Kahn also makes a playable appearance in the GameCube version of Mortal Kombat: Deception, where it is revealed that the Deadly Alliance killed a decoy of the emperor as the real Shao Kahn had set out to reclaim his empire from the resurrected dragon king Onaga.

In Mortal Kombat: Armageddon, Shao Kahn returned as a playable character. In the game's story, he reclaimed his title as ruler of Outworld following Onaga's defeat. He later forms an uneasy alliance with Quan Chi, Shang Tsung, and Onaga to defeat the elemental Blaze so they can seize his godlike powers.

Shao Kahn and Darkseid are the key villains in the 2008 crossover game Mortal Kombat vs. DC Universe, though both are playable characters. In the game's plot, a defeated Shao Kahn meets with his secret ally, Quan Chi. They are confronted by Raiden, who knocks him into Quan Chi’s portal. This event, along with a parallel one between Superman and Darkseid in the DC Universe, results in the creation of Dark Kahn, who serves as the main antagonist of the game. After Dark Kahn is defeated, Shao Kahn ends up in Darkseid's throne room, where he discovers he has lost his powers before being imprisoned in the Phantom Zone. However, his powers soon came back and he was able to free himself along with everyone else in the Phantom Zone; who pledged their allegiance to him in return.

In the 2011 Mortal Kombat reboot, which retells the continuity of the first three games, Shao Kahn is once again the main villain and final boss of the game's arcade ladder and story mode. Shao Kahn kills Raiden after acquiring Blaze's powers, but Raiden is able to send prophetic messages to his past self. As Shao Kahn invades Earthrealm, Raiden chooses not to intervene until the Elder Gods, enraged by the former's violation of the Mortal Kombat tournament's rules, empower Raiden and allow him to kill the emperor.

While this averts the timeline leading to Armageddon and restores Earthrealm, Mortal Kombat X reveals that Kitana's clone, Mileena, succeeds Shao Kahn in ruling Outworld before she is overthrown by Shao Kahn's former general, Kotal Kahn.

In Mortal Kombat 11, a past version of Shao Kahn is brought to the present timeline by Kronika, the keeper of time. Upon arriving, he is outraged to learn of his death and that Kotal Kahn became Outworld's ruler. He agrees to work for Kronika after learning that she is planning to rewind the timeline and wipe Raiden from existence. He attempts to take his throne back from Kotal and rebuild Outworld's forces, but he is defeated by Kitana, who becomes the new ruler of Outworld and Kotal's successor. In the DLC storyline expansion Aftermath, Shao Kahn and Sindel are reunited after a time-travelling Fujin and Shang Tsung revive her to help fight Kronika. Intending to take Kronika's Crown of Souls for themselves, the tyrants defeat Kitana and Liu Kang and assault Kronika's keep. However, they are betrayed by Shang Tsung, who absorbs their souls. In his non-canonical arcade ending, Shao Kahn merges all timelines into a Singularity, and becomes the undefeated Mortal Kombat champion for centuries.

Character design and gameplay

Kahn's attire for Mortal Kombat II was developed by Mark Runion. Kahn started out unmasked and with large gnashing teeth similar to Baraka, since everyone from Outworld was originally supposed to be of Baraka's race. The idea of all inhabitants of Outworld being Tarkatan was later dropped. It was originally stated that Shao Kahn is a demonic character, and his monstrous visage from the official comic books, as well as Mortal Kombat: Shaolin Monks lends credibility to that. In Mortal Kombat 9, he appears to simply be a large human, although his face is never seen. His face has only appeared in Shaolin Monks and Mortal Kombat 11; with the latter revealing an inhuman, but not monstrous, face.

In MKII, Kahn was digitally resized to a taller height to make him tower over the playable characters, and was played by actor and bodybuilder Brian Glynn. In many official depictions of Shao Kahn made by Midway, he is shown wearing a cape, though he never wore one in his original digitized appearances. Mortal Kombat: Deception was the first time in which he wore the cape in-game. Mortal Kombat sound designer Dan Forden explained that the reason for Kahn not wearing the cape in earlier games, in addition to Kabal not being able to wear a trenchcoat in Mortal Kombat 3, was that loose flowing clothing took up memory.

Shao Kahn originated as an unplayable boss character in MKII. He is fought as a boss (in most cases, the final boss) in most of his appearances, but became a player character for the first time in the home ports of MK3 as an unlockable character. He would also be playable in the home ports of Ultimate Mortal Kombat 3, Mortal Kombat Trilogy, the GameCube and PlayStation Portable versions of Mortal Kombat: Deception, Mortal Kombat: Armageddon and Mortal Kombat vs. DC Universe. Shao Kahn also appears as a playable character in Mortal Kombat 11 via DLC. In Mortal Kombat (2011), Shao Kahn is once again a non-playable boss. He is also the final boss in the beat 'em up spin-off, Shaolin Monks.

Shao Kahn's special moves consist mainly of powerful shoulder barges, magical projectiles, and attacks with his signature giant maul, the "Wrath Hammer". In some of his appearances as a boss, blocking Kahn's attacks will stun the player. Since his debut, his signature tactic has been taunting players before, during, and after rounds with such statements as "Bow to me!", "Feel the power of Shao Kahn!" and "It's official, you suck!"

Other media

Shao Kahn makes his first appearance in MK comic books during the Battlewave miniseries by Malibu Comics, though he already was present in the first, Blood & Thunder. Shao Kahn remained mostly faithful to his game counterpart, being the Emperor of Outworld and attempting to take Earthrealm for himself. In Battlewave, Shao Kahn would arrange a different plan to open the portals. He kidnaps Sonya Blade and, by means of hypnosis and brainwashing, convinces her to marry him; the marriage would weaken the barriers between realms enough to allow Shao Kahn to seize Earth easily (and make Sonya the queen of both realms and his wife). During these two series, he never appears wielding his trademark helmet (instead, he is always shown with his visible face and design taken from the official Mortal Kombat II comic by John Tobias), only in the comic Kitana & Mileena (in which he loves Kitana).

Shao Kahn appears in the first two theatrically-released Mortal Kombat films. In the 1995 first movie he is referred to simply as "The Emperor" and makes a brief appearance at the end, as a special effect and voiced by Frank Welker. Kahn (his name, incorrectly hyphenated in the closing credits of Annihilation, is additionally misspelled as "Shoa-Kahn" on the DVD release's fight scenes menu), played by Brian Thompson, is the antagonist in the 1997 sequel, Mortal Kombat: Annihilation. In the film, he fights Raiden, Johnny Cage and Liu Kang. He kills Johnny Cage in the film's opening scene, murders his own allies Rain and Jade, and then Raiden is killed by Kahn prior to his fight with Liu Kang. Kahn and Raiden are portrayed as brothers, with Shinnok as their father, though neither of them share any relation in the games (though the later Mortal Kombat vs. DC Universe states that the two are brothers in Raiden's biography). The only subplot taken directly from the games' storyline was his past relationship with Kitana and Sindel; a segment in the film featured Kitana, imprisoned in Kahn's fortress, mentioning the destruction of her family and Sindel's subsequent suicide under his rule.

He was played by Jeffrey D. Harris and Ted Nordblum in the 1995-1996 stage show Mortal Kombat: Live Tour. A Shao Kahn action figure was released in 1996 by Toy Island in the Mortal Kombat Trilogy series. He was also one of the characters featured in the collectible card game Mortal Kombat Kard Game.

Shao Kahn was played by Jeffrey Meek (who also played Raiden) in the TV series Mortal Kombat: Conquest. Despite having lost much of his physical stature from the games and movies, the character has a much more threatening disposition, serving as the mediator of the Mortal Kombat matches. Meek played opposite himself in the series finale, where Kahn battles Raiden in a void seemingly between the realms. With Kung Lao dead, Shao Kahn forces Raiden into submission and commences full military assault on Earthrealm. The series was discontinued following this event.

He also makes several appearances in the cartoon series Mortal Kombat: Defenders of the Realm, voiced by John Vernon, in his usual role of Outworld's emperor and the leader of the enemy forces.

Aleks Paunovic portrayed an unmasked (human) Shao Kahn for the web series Mortal Kombat: Legacy two-part episode "Kitana & Mileena", dealing with his early rule over the conquered Edenia and an alternate version of his relationship to Sindel, Kitana and Mileena. 

Shao Kahn appears in the animated film Mortal Kombat Legends: Scorpion's Revenge and the sequel Mortal Kombat Legends: Battle of the Realms, voiced by Fred Tatasciore.

Reception

Shao Kahn was nominated in Nintendo Power Awards '94 and '95 in the category "Worst Villain" (actually meaning the best villain) of the year, coming second place in 1995. GamesRadar praised Shao Kahn's role as an antagonist, putting him in their 2013 list of the best villains in video game history at number 24, and including him among the 12 most unfair gaming bosses in 2014. Guinness World Records Gamer's Edition listed Shao Kahn as 41st in their list of "top 50 video game villains". Complex ranked Shao Kahn from Mortal Kombat II as the "coolest" boss in fighting game history in 2012, stating that "in the history of fighting games, no boss has ever been cooler or more exciting to lose against." The GamesRadar staff described Shao Kahn as the best villain in video games, stating that "There are plenty of bad guys in the Mortal Kombat games, but the Emperor of Outworld, Shao Kahn, takes the wickedness cake."

In UGO's 2012 list of the top Mortal Kombat characters, Shao Kahn placed sixteenth. In their retrospection listing of MK characters, UGO stated most favorite thing about him was the fact that "his speaking voice is the voice of the announcer heard throughout the series." Complex placed him seventh on her 2013 list of most brutal fighters in Mortal Kombat, adding that "he was brutal not only in his strength but his cunning, too."

In 2010, Game Informer featured him on their list of gaming's "crappiest" fathers, commenting he "is more like an abusive, drunken stepfather than a crappy biological father [and is] also a terrible husband." The character's incarnation in the 2011 Mortal Kombat has been criticized for how hard it is to defeat him to the point of frustrating gamers; that same year, CraveOnline included him on the list of top five "bosses you want to kill but can't". The fight against Shao Kahn in Mortal Kombat 3 was also noted for its difficulty; in 2013, Complex ranked it as the 23rd hardest boss battle in video games.

References

Action film characters
Action film villains
Deity characters in video games
Demon characters in video games
Dictator characters in video games
Emperor and empress characters in video games
Extraterrestrial characters in video games
Fictional martial artists in video games
Fictional Changquan practitioners
Fictional Xing Yi Quan practitioners
Fictional characters with immortality
Fictional characters with superhuman durability or invulnerability
Fictional gods
Fictional hammer fighters
Fictional mass murderers
Fictional polearm and spearfighters
Fictional warlords in video games
Male characters in video games
Male film villains
Male supervillains
Male video game villains
Mortal Kombat characters
Science fantasy video game characters
Video game antagonists
Video game bosses
Video game characters introduced in 1993
Video game characters with superhuman strength